The Widow's Might is a 2009 American independent Christian film directed by John Robert Moore and starring Angela Coates, John Robert Moore, Cameron Heidrick, and Gator Moore. It is set in modern-day Texas and the Old West. It has been praised as "a groundbreaking film, even though it is a first feature film from a teenaged director." The film won the Audience Choice Award and the $101,000 Best of Festival award in the San Antonio Independent Christian Film Festival.

Premise 
The film, a musical comedy, tells the story of an elderly widow battling the government to save her home from tax foreclosure, and of the families who help her.

Awards 
The film won the Audience Choice Award and the $101,000 Best of Festival award in the San Antonio Independent Christian Film Festival, beating films such as Fireproof and Expelled: No Intelligence Allowed.

Theatrical release and reception 
In April, 2009, the film opened to play for one week in 94 U.S. cities across the Midwest and South.

Alex and Brett Harris, in their book Start Here: Doing Hard Things Right Where You Are, discuss the film as a successful example of a challenging project carried out by teenagers.

References

External links 
 
 
 Teens star in independent film venture

2009 films
2009 drama films
Films about evangelicalism
American drama films
2000s English-language films
2000s American films